Joanna Pfaff-Czarnecka (born: 20 July 1956) is a university professor in the Faculty of Sociology at Bielefeld University, Germany. She is a former Pro-Vice-Rector at Bielefeld University and former Dean of the Faculty of Sociology at the University.

Early life and education
Pfaff-Czarnecka was born in Warsaw, Poland to Janina (1932-2019) and Jerzy Czarnecki (1924-2007). The family moved to Switzerland in 1972.
Between 1975 and 1983 Pfaff-Czarnecka studied social anthropology, law, communication studies, European anthropology and art history at the University of Zurich, Switzerland, and also completed a doctoral degree there.

Career
Pfaff-Czarnecka worked at the Institute of Social Anthropology of the University of Zurich between 1983 and 1999 as scientific assistant, lecturer, reader and research fellow. Between 1989 and 1999, she also worked as development expert and as translator for the International Committee of the Red Cross. In the years 1999-2001 she acted as scientific collaborator and deputy director at the Center for Development Research at the University of Bonn. She was appointed as full university professor at Bielefeld University (chair in Social Anthropology) in 2001.
She has also taught at the universities of Bern, Oxford, Tokyo and Kathmandu and held several international Visiting Fellowships and professorships.

Pfaff-Czarnecka has engaged in several academic administration and offices: she was President of the Swiss Society of Social Anthropology (1996-1999); Pro-Vice-Rector of Bielefeld University (2007-2009); member of the Commission 38 of the CNRS (France; 2004-2007); Dean of the Faculty of Sociology at Bielefeld University (2018-19); Co-Director of the Center for Interdisciplinary Research (Bielefeld University; 2011-2019) and senate member of the German Research Foundation (DFG).

Research
Pfaff-Czarnecka conducted field research in the Himalayan region (especially in Nepal) as well as in the middle European immigration societies. Among her research topics are the Hindu caste system, democratization processes at the sub and the supra-national level, ethnic relations and the theory of belonging.

She conducts research on the social life of universities, focusing on heterogeneities and inequalities in study processes, as well as on knowledge production and circulation in the Asian region.

Main publications
 Nepal and the Wealth of Knowledge. Inequality, Aspiration, Competition and Belonging. The Mahesh Chandra Regmi Lecture. Kathmandu, Nepal: Social Science Baha, 2019.
 Zugehörigkeit in der mobilen Welt: Politiken der Verortung. Das Politische als Kommunikation, Band 3. Göttingen: Wallstein, 2012.
 Ethnic Futures. State and Identity in Four Asian Countries, written together with D. Rajasingham, A. Nandy and T. Gomez. New Delhi: Sage, 1999. (several editions)
 Macht und rituelle Reinheit. Hinduistisches Kastenwesen und ethnische Beziehungen im Entwicklungsprozess Nepals. Grüsch: Rüegger, 1989.

Edited volumes (selection)
 Das soziale Leben der Universität. Bielefeld: Transcript Verlag, 2017.
 Spaces of Violence in South Asian Democracies: Citizenship, Nationalist Exclusion and the (il)legitimate Use of Force, together with E. Gerharz. Asian Journal of Social Science (Brill) 2017, 45(6): 613-638.
 Facing Globalization in the Himalayas. Belonging and the Politics of the Self, together with G. Toffin. New Delhi: Sage, 2013.  
 The Politics of Belonging in the Himalayas: Local Attachments and Boundary Dynamics, together with G. Toffin. New Delhi: Sage, 2011.  
 Nationalism and Ethnicity in Nepal, together with D. Gellner und J. Whelpton. Kathmandu: Vajra Publishers, 2008.  (several editions)
 Die Ethnisierung des Politischen. Identitätspolitiken in Lateinamerika, Asien und den USA, together with C. Büschges. Frankfurt/New York: Campus, 2007.
 Rituale heute: Theorien, Kontroversen, Entwürfe, together with C. Caduff. Berlin: Reimer, 1999.  (two editions)

Recent publications
 Pfaff-Czarnecka, Joanna (2020): Shaping Asia through Student Mobilities. American Behavioral Scientist: p. 1-15.
 Pfaff-Czarnecka, Joanna, Brosius, Christiane (2019): Shaping Asia: Connectivities, Comparisons, Collaborations. isa.e-Forum, ISA (Editorial Arrangement of isa.e-Forum)
 Pfaff-Czarnecka, Joanna (2019): Nepal and the Wealth of Knowledge. Inequality, Aspiration, Competition and Belonging. (The Mahesh Chandra Regmi Lecture 2019) Kathmandu/Nepal: Social Science Baha.
 Pfaff-Czarnecka, Joanna (2019): Burdened Futures: Educated Dalits' Quandaries in Contemporary Nepal. Contributions to Nepalese Studies 46 (Special Issue: Nepal's Dalits in transition): 195-227.
 Pfaff-Czarnecka, Joanna (2018): Education sentimentale in migrant students' university trajectories. Family, and other significant relations. In:  Rötterger-Rössler, Birgitt, Slaby, Jan: Affect in relation. Families, places, technologies. London/New York: Routledge, p. 50-71.

External links
 Prof. Dr. Joanna Pfaff-Czarnecka Bielefeld University
 An Interview with Professor Joanna Pfaff-Czarnecka International Sociological Association

References 

Swiss anthropologists
Swiss women anthropologists
Swiss women sociologists
Social anthropologists
Swiss sociologists
Academic staff of Bielefeld University
University of Zurich alumni
1956 births
Living people